Blue Envoy (a Rainbow Code name) was a British project to develop a ramjet-powered surface-to-air missile. It was tasked with countering supersonic bomber aircraft launching stand-off missiles, and thus had to have very long range and high-speed capabilities.

Development started as Green Sparkler sometime in the early 1950s. Green Sparkler featured active radar homing, but it was quickly decided this was beyond the state of the art. Replacing the active homing with semi-active radar homing produced Blue Envoy. The designs were otherwise similar, and similar to the US CIM-10 Bomarc as well.

Test launches of sub-scale models were carried out successfully, and development of the new ramjet engines and seeker electronics was well advanced when the project was cancelled in April 1957 as part of the 1957 Defence White Paper. Its cancellation made Blue Envoy "possibly the most enigmatic project in the field of 1950s United Kingdom weapons development."

An impromptu meeting between the contractors led to a proposal to use the guidance system and ramjets to upgrade the Bloodhound Mk. I missile design. This private proposal was accepted and became Bloodhound Mk. The Bloodhound Mk. II would ultimately serve as Britain's primary air defence missile into the 1990s.

History

ROTOR plan

During the late 1940s a series of events prompted the complete reformation of the British air defence system. This led to ROTOR, which was designed to provide widespread radar coverage of the entire British Isles and defend that airspace using a combination of interceptor aircraft and anti-aircraft artillery.

In 1953, as part of continual modifications to the ROTOR concept, the anti-aircraft artillery was to be replaced by surface-to-air missiles (SAMs), or as they are known in the UK, surface-to-air guided weapons (SAGW).

Two designs were entered for the Stage 1 missile contract, English Electric's Red Shoes and Bristol Aerospace's Red Duster. The Royal Aircraft Establishment (RAE), who was in overall control of missile development, was interested in seeing ramjet propulsion developed, and suggested Red Duster move to this form of power. Otherwise the two systems were very similar designs, even sharing the same Marconi designed radar systems. Red Shoes emerged as the  ranged Thunderbird, while Red Duster became the  ranged Bloodhound.

Green Sparkler
Work on the Stage 2 missile did not begin until sometime later, initially under the name Green Sparkler. Stage 2 was tasked with effectively countering bomber aircraft flying at supersonic speeds at very high altitudes that were potentially launching stand-off missiles from hundreds of miles range. In order to stop these attacks before they reached their launching points, the missile had to have long range. This, in turn, demanded high speed as there would only be a short time between detection on radar and the aircraft reaching their launching areas.

This was beyond what could be effectively guided using a semi-active radar homing like the ones used on Thunderbird and Bloodhound. Instead, Green Sparkler used command guidance for much of the mission, switching to an active radar seeker in the last  of the approach. Two seekers were considered, one using a continuous wave radar with separate transmit and receive dishes in the nose, and another using a pulse doppler radar using a single dish. Both were to also offer home-on-jamming.

Some consideration was given to using the US's BOMARC for the Stage 2 role. This was ultimately rejected because while the BOMARC had the desired active radar seeker, it was (at that time) a simple non-doppler pulse unit that would be very easy to jam using the recently introduced carcinotron. They also considered the  range excessive, given that the AMES Type 80 radars that would be providing initial aiming had a range of just over 200 nmi, meaning this very large missile's range performance would be somewhat wasted.

As the Soviets introduced new bomber designs, it appeared that there would be a period in the late 1950s where the Stage 1 missiles would not be adequate while the Stage 2 missile would still be under development. This led to the introduction of the "vulgar fractions"; Stage  and Stage .

This shorter-range proposal became Blue Envoy. By this time the Royal Navy was concerned about similar stand-off missile attacks against their ships. They developed a requirement for a similar long-range missile. Bristol's design was the only entry for this contest.

Blue Envoy
Although Blue Envoy, and Green Sparkler, shared many broadly similar features with the Red Duster, it was an entirely different design in detail. In order to deal with the skin friction heating of its Mach 3 performance, the entire missile was made of stainless steel rather than aluminium. The speed was measured by a thermometer, adjusting the ramjet power to keep the skin temperature under . To reach those speeds, a larger  diameter ramjet engine was required. Overall, the fuselage was not much larger than Red Duster, and did not carry appreciably more fuel.

To reach the required range, increased from Red Duster's  to Blue Envoy's , the missile did not fly directly at its targets. Instead, it was "lofted" on a near-vertical ascent into the high atmosphere, where it could coast in the thin air for long distances. Control at these altitudes was difficult, and while Blue Envoy retained Red Duster's "twist-n-steer" guidance system, it had much larger tailless compound delta wings in place of the original smaller clipped delta wings and separate tail surfaces. Vertical stabilizers were mounted about  along the wing span, closer to the tips.

The initial layout, developed by Dietrich Küchemann, had the main portion of the wing swept at 75 degrees, lowered to 42 degrees outboard of the vertical stabilizers. Wind tunnel testing demonstrated that this layout caused interference with the air intakes for the engines. Roy Hawkins of the Royal Aircraft Establishment experimented with many different planforms before settling on the addition of a further forward extension of the wing with an initial sweep at 82 degrees before meeting the original layout aft the engine inlets.

Controlling the missile during its initial launch and climb was a difficult problem. Normally, missiles use some form of proportional navigation, an algorithm that determines a near-perfect interception vector based on nothing more than the angular velocity of the target relative to the missile. Blue Envoy was designed to be launched long before the target became visible to the missile's radar receiver, and thus had to use command guidance for an extended period of the flight. The missile would be flown toward the approximate intercept location, and then as it approached, fed information on where to look for the target.

Ferranti began the development of a small digital computer to perform these intercept calculations. The computer would be fed the target location from a new tactical control radar under development as Orange Yeoman. The computer would then calculate an approximate intercept point and feed that information to the missile's autopilot. The computer also sent the current angular location of the target relative to the missile, the "angle error", so the missile could keep the receiver aimed in the right direction, listening for the signal of the guidance radar. Some thought was also given to using the computer to directly control the missile's control surfaces, perhaps only during testing.

Cancellation
Sub-scale models of the Blue Envoy vehicle were being tested when the project was cancelled in April 1957 as part of the suggestions of the 1957 Defence White Paper.

Up to this time, UK war plans were based on the concept of the three-day war, in which a Warsaw Pact attack was met with the use of tactical nuclear weapons. The war would be won or lost long before the Warsaw Pact forces reached the English Channel, so a conventional invasion was simply not a consideration. At any time, the war might "go strategic" and would be fought between Soviet bombers and RAF interceptors; the interceptors would either destroy the bombers hundreds of miles from shore, or the UK would be destroyed.

The White Paper considered the effects of the introduction of nuclear-armed ballistic missiles to these warfighting scenarios. The UK was within the range of medium range ballistic missiles (MRBMs) stationed in East Germany, which had a flight time on the order of 15 minutes or less. Unlike the ICBMs being developed by the US and USSR, these medium-range missiles were simpler and cheaper. It was expected that by from the mid-1960s, the main attack on the UK would be carried out by these missiles. There was no credible scenario where they would use only bombers; if an attack by bombers was detected, this would only signal that missiles were soon to follow.

As there was no defence against ballistic missiles, the only possible counter was deterrence. The UK's V bomber deterrent was highly vulnerable while on the ground, so any signal of an attack required their immediate launch. In such an environment, defence systems like Blue Envoy did not make much sense; in any scenario where the Blue Envoy might be used against bombers, the V bombers would have to be launched anyway because missiles were sure to follow. In that case, you simply launch on warning and that would leave Blue Envoy defending empty airfields. The logic was considered so convincing that any attempt to defend the deterrent force was eventually abandoned.

There were also problems with the design itself. Experiments with stainless steel construction on the Bristol 188 had demonstrated this material was much more difficult to work with than expected. Further, the Navy was planning a new series of smaller ships, and Blue Envoy would be too large to be carried by them.

Bloodhound Mark II
The cancellation of Blue Envoy caught Bristol by surprise, and they had no other ongoing projects to keep the missile division running. Don Rowley, Director of the Guided Weapons Division, was quoted saying:

At the time of its cancellation, development of its radar systems and ramjet engines was largely complete. Bristol and Ferranti engineers came up with the plan of using these parts of Blue Envoy on a new version of Red Duster - by this time known as the Bloodhound - which would offer a reasonable improvement in performance for very low development cost.

The proposal proved interesting enough that it was ordered into production in spite of the very low priority for air defenses after 1957. The resulting Bloodhound Mark II entered service in 1965. Many changes were made as part of this process. The new 18-inch engines were added to the design, providing more thrust and allowing higher weights. This capacity was used to increase the fuel storage by extending the missile's fuselage until it was even longer than Blue Envoy. Another major change was that the seeker now used the new AMES Type 86 and AMES Type 87 radars, which were continuous-wave radars that could track targets very close to the ground and were much more resistant to jamming.

These changes made Bloodhound a much more formidable weapon, and in this form, it served into the 1990s.

New Guided Missile
Although the RAF no longer believed defence from air attack would be successful, the RN still had a need to fend off attacks by strike aircraft. The cancellation of Blue Envoy left their plans for an advanced wide-area air defence without a weapon. They started the New Guided Missile Program, or NIGS for short, to replace the existing Seaslug missile on the County-class destroyers with a missile of much higher performance and a fire control system and radar that could track multiple targets, similar to the modern Aegis Combat System.

Although NIGS generated some interest in the late 1950s, by 1958 it had already been decided that the need for a modernized shorter range weapon was more urgent. NIGS continued at a lower priority while the new and somewhat simpler Sea Dart was given full development. By September 1959 a small, ramjet-powered upper stage with a large solid-fuel booster had been produced, similar to the contemporary US design, RIM-50 Typhon. There was some literature that suggested NIGS and Typhon would be close enough in size to be interchangeable. Later documents put the range at 150 nm, the same as Blue Envoy, although the missile was much smaller. Carriage of more than 60 missiles were considered in some ship configurations.

See also

Notes

References

Citations

Bibliography 
 
 
 

Abandoned military projects of the United Kingdom
Cold War missiles of the United Kingdom
Surface-to-air missiles of the United Kingdom